Kim Kirkpatrick (born 1952) is a landscape photographer who lives and works in the Washington, D.C. area.

Kirkpatrick earned a Bachelor of Fine Arts from the Corcoran College of Art and Design and a Master of Fine Arts from the University of Maryland. In 1993, the Aaron Siskind Foundation awarded Kirkpatrick an Individual Photographers Fellowship Grant. Kirkpatrick taught photography as an adjunct member of the faculty at the Corcoran College of Art and Design and at the Smithsonian Residents Associate Program. He has exhibited his photography in galleries and museums. The musical group Interface used a Kirkpatrick photograph on the cover of their CD "./swank."

Kirkpatrick's landscape photos focus on construction and industrial zones around Washington D.C. As Kirkpatrick said in a 2001 interview, "I take pictures where nature and man meet, where one is taking over the other".  He uses an  8×10 view camera because, Kirkpatrick said, its high-resolution image,  "never falls apart, even when you get closer," adding, "I want the detail that people miss."
Sally Troyer, a D.C. gallery owner, said of Kirkpatrick's work, "I have never seen work so sensitive to light and color."
Kirkpatrick created a large body of work in five to six years during the 1980s and 1990s that extensively used the photo effect, bokeh (the effect of light in out-of-focus areas of a photograph). Mike Johnston noted, in reference to bokeh, that Kirkpatrick "made deft use of it as design, as figuration, and as a way to use color abstractly". Mike Johnston further wrote that Kirkpatrick is "the American master of bokeh-aji " and selected Kirkpatrick as one of the 10 best living U.S. photographers.
Kirkpatrick once worked as a postman, and also as a disc jockey on Washington D.C. radio stations including WHFS and WAMU. He continues to write and publish music reviews on a blog that he co-directs.

Exhibitions

 Strathmore Hall Arts Center
 Maryland Art Place
 Boyden Gallery, St Mary's College of Maryland
 The Print Club, Philadelphia PA
 Troyer Gallery, Washington, D.C.
 Luce de Ombra, Gallery of the CF, Rome, Italy
 Sight Specific, Curator, US Geological Survey
 "More than one way to skin a cat" (group show), January 2006. Salve Regina Gallery, Catholic University, Washington D.C.

Notes

External links 

  Kirkpatrick's site

1952 births
American photographers
Living people
Corcoran School of the Arts and Design faculty
University of Maryland, College Park alumni
Corcoran School of the Arts and Design alumni
Artists from Washington, D.C.